Gamō is a Japanese surname. Notable people with the surname include:

 Gamō clan (蒲生氏, Gamō-shi), Japanese clan which claimed descent from the Fujiwara clan
 Gamō Hiroshi (ガモウ ひろし), manga artist known for his works at the magazine Weekly Shōnen Jump
 Shigeo Gamō (蒲生, 重男; ガモウ, シゲオ, born 1928), Japanese biologist and specialist of crustaceans
 Gamō Hideyuki (蒲生 秀行, 1583–1612), Japanese daimyō who ruled the Aizu domain
 Gamō Katahide (蒲生 賢秀) (1534–1584), Japanese daimyō of the Sengoku and Azuchi-Momoyama periods
, Japanese handball player
 Gamō Ujisato (蒲生 氏郷, 1556–1595), Japanese daimyō of the Sengoku and Azuchi-Momoyama periods
, Japanese educator

Japanese-language surnames